Datsun 1600 may refer to one of the following Datsun cars:

 Datsun 1600 (510), sold as Datsun 1600 in Australia, and Datsun 510 in U.S. and Canada
 Datsun Fairlady 1600 Roadster SP311/SPL311
 Nissan Silvia, which was marketed in Australia as the Datsun 1600 Coupe

1600